Elaeocarpus grandis, commonly known as caloon, white quandong, blue quandong, silver quandong, blue fig or blueberry ash, is species of flowering plant in the family Elaeocarpaceae and is endemic to eastern Australia. It is a large tree with buttress roots at the base of the trunk, oblong to elliptic leaves with small teeth on the edges, racemes of greenish-white flowers and more or less spherical blue fruit.

Elaeocarpus grandis was known as the extremely similar and possibly synonymous E. angustifolius in Australia from 1980 until 2010, thus numerous sources used as references for this article refer to E. grandis by that name. 
Before 1980 the trees were usually known as E. sphaericus, an illegitimate name used for E. angustifolius at the time.

Description
The leaves have many small domatia and turn bright red before falling. There are between fifty and fifty-five stamens and the ovary is hairy. Flowering occurs in autumn and the fruit is a more or less spherical blue drupe  in diameter with a deeply sculptured stone. Note the second source for this description is a description of Elaeocarpus angustifolius.

Similar species
It cannot reliably be told apart from the widespread and variable species E. angustifolius, aside from where the plant is growing: plants in Queensland and New South Wales are considered E. grandis, those found growing elsewhere are E. angustifolius. Many regional forms of E. angustifolius were described in the past, but these are at present all considered the same species. Despite this, some local Australian databases do not recognise the synonymy, and due to this E. grandis remains recognised as a valid species.

E. grandis/angustifolius can, however, be told apart from other species of Elaeocarpus by having petals much divided at the apex; small, round fruit; 5-7 locules per stone; straight embryos; and glabrous leaves with even and fine serrations along their margins. In New South Wales, E. grandis/angustifolius is most similar to E. obovatus and E. holopetalus. E. obovatus has irregular teeth along the leaf margins and less secondary veins per leaf. E. holopetalus has similar veined and toothed leaves, but lacks domatia on them and has a much shorter petiole.

Taxonomy and naming
Elaeocarpus grandis was first formally described in 1860 by Ferdinand von Mueller in his book Fragmenta Phytographiae Australiae from material collected on the banks of the Pine River. The name was largely forgotten, but in 1984 the botanist M.J.E. Coode, an Elaeocarpus expert, was the first to list it as a synonym of the species E. angustifolius in his work Elaeocarpus in Australia and New Zealand. In 2010 it was accepted as a valid species again by the Australian Plant Census. The Australian Plant Census database claims Coode's description of E. angustifolius as a description of E. grandis, however, the description was first prepared by Coode in 1981 for his work on the Elaeocarpus of the Papuasia region. In his 2010 work on the Ganitrus group of species, Coode reiterated that according to him E. grandis is indistinguishable from E. angustifolius sensu stricto, as found throughout the greater Oceania and Southeast Asia region.

A 2013 thesis using molecular phylogenetics to study the Elaeocarpus in Australasia found E. grandis was near identical to E. angustifolius in most sequences studied, but that in one sequence with more variety two E. grandis samples (one from Hawaii as E. sphaericus) were found to be within the diversity of E. angustifolius, with the two samples in fact more divergent from each other than from other samples within the E. angustifolius synonymy.

The word 'quandong' originally referred to the deeply sculptured stone within the fruit.

Distribution and habitat
Blue quandong grows in rainforest and along moist, scrubby watercourses from Cooktown in far north Queensland to the Nambucca River in northern New South Wales.

Ecology
It can fruit throughout the year. The fruit of E. grandis is eaten by birds, including the wompoo fruit-dove, southern cassowary and Australian brushturkey. Bower birds may collect the fruit for their colour, creating large piles of the stones.

It was one among a few dozen species of large-fruited (for Australian standards) rainforest plants eaten by southern cassowaries in Northern Australia. These flightless birds feed on the fruit and likely disperse the seeds -they have been found to eat all types of Elaeocarpus fruit. Although seeds which are dispersed in cassowary dung do germinate, the percentage is quite low in Elaeocarpus as compared to other rainforest species eaten by the giant birds.

The fruit are eaten by Lumholtz tree-kangaroos (Dendrolagus lumholtzi). Flying foxes (genus Pteropus) also eat the fruit.

The larvae of the moths Echiomima mythica and Eschatura lemurias bore into the stems of this plant (as E. angustifolius).

Uses

Horticulture
The wide-ranging buttress roots and size make the blue quandong unsuitable for suburban home gardens or planting near drains.

Timber
The species is well regarded for its timber and as a key part in regenerating rainforest. In the colonial period, the timber was used for furniture, construction and for racing sculls and oars.

Use as food
Indigenous Australians ate the fruit raw or buried the unripe fruit in sand for four days making it sweet and more palatable. Early settlers used the fruit for jams, pies and pickles.

Decoration
Aboriginal people used the stones to make necklaces.

Gallery

References

grandis
Flora of New South Wales
Flora of Queensland
Plants described in 1860
Taxa named by Ferdinand von Mueller